Bekkelaget is a borough in the city of Oslo, Norway.

Bekkelaget may also refer to:

Places
Bekkelaget, Innlandet, an urban village in Stange municipality, Innlandet county, Norway
Bekkelaget Church, a church in the borough of Bekkelaget, Oslo, Norway
Bekkelaget station, a former railway station in Oslo, Norway
Bekkelaget Tunnel, a railway tunnel in Oslo, Norway

Other
Bekkelaget SK, a sports club in Oslo, Norway